Air Niugini Limited is the national airline of Papua New Guinea, based in Air Niugini House on the property of Port Moresby International Airport, Port Moresby. It operates a domestic network from Port Moresby to 12 major airports while its subsidiary company, Link PNG, operates routes to minor airports. It also operates international services in Asia, Oceania, and Australia on a weekly basis. Its main base is Port Moresby International Airport, which is located in 7 Mile, Port Moresby, Papua New Guinea.  Niugini is the Tok Pisin word for New Guinea.

History 

The airline was established in November 1973 as the national airline of Papua New Guinea with the government holding 60% of the shares, Ansett (16%), Qantas (12%) and Trans Australia Airlines (TAA) (12%). It started as an exclusively domestic carrier; however it expanded to offer international services shortly thereafter. In founding the airline, the government aimed to encourage regional development in a country without an extensive road network. The airline was established using DC-3 and Fokker F27 aircraft.

In 1975 when PNG gained independence, pilots from the two airlines operating for the government were from Ansett Australia and Trans Australia Airlines. The majority of these pilots elected to return to these companies and continue their careers in Australia. This left a huge shortage in the pilot strength (over 95%) and consequently replacements were recruited from both Australia and New Zealand. These pilots had little or no experience in airline operations and few if any skills or experience operating in the extremely hostile environs of PNG.

Nonetheless, they were trained by the outgoing pilots from Ansett and TAA and with the first class training behind them continued to provide safe and reliable services to all of PNG. When Air Niugini took over the international routes - then operated by Qantas - once again the senior pilots were called upon to convert from basic turboprop aircraft (F27) to B707-338C 4-engine jet aircraft. Considerable alarm was expressed that these "jungle pilots" could not possibly operate large jet aircraft hitherto flown by Qantas flight crews. Again with excellent training and support from Qantas, the PX crews converted successfully to the venerable B707 and from there took over all the check and training on those two aircraft and continued thereafter to the various replacement aircraft being primarily A300-B4, A310-300, B757 and B767.

There were two crashes internally on the domestic operation with the total loss of one F28 aircraft and one DHC7, both due to pilot error. No deaths or injuries occurred in either crash.

International services commenced very early on in the history of the airline with a leased Boeing 720 from 6 February 1976 to 2 February 1977.  This was later replaced with a Boeing 707 purchased from Qantas. During the late 1970s, internal services were performed by a combination of Fokker F28 jet and Fokker F27 turbo-prop aircraft. By the end of 1975 Air Niugini leased Boeing 727-200 type aircraft from Ansett and TAA to serve routes to Brisbane. The airline also acquired a lease of a Boeing 707 from Qantas to commence a weekly service to Manila and Hong Kong. In 1976, the government bought out the Qantas and TAA holdings and in 1980 acquired the Ansett shares to make the airline wholly government owned. The fleet of F-27s was phased out in the early 1980s with the introduction of the newly developed de Havilland Canada Dash 7 four-engine turbo-prop.

In 1979, Air Niugini opened routes to Honolulu and to Singapore via Jakarta. That same year, new facilities were opened at Jacksons Airport and new Sales Offices opened in Hong Kong, Tokyo, Europe and the United States.
Air Niugini operated their Boeing 707 from Auckland to Hong Kong via Port Moresby in a tripartite agreement with Air New Zealand and Cathay Pacific. This service ran from 1981 to 1985.

In 1984, the airline replaced the two Boeing 707 aircraft with an Airbus A300 on lease from TAA. This was replaced several years later with two Airbus A310s as the carrier expanded to offer flights principally between Australian Eastern capital cities and destinations in Asia such as Singapore and Manila via their hub Port Moresby.

The airline endured considerable hardships in the 1990s, with unrest in Bougainville and a volcanic eruption in Rabaul destabilising the company's busiest domestic services. The Asian currency crisis also made an impact, with Air Niugini posting financial losses during this decade. The government of Papua New Guinea responded by cutting jobs from the airline, suppressing wages, as well as opening offices in Asia and Europe in an attempt at having the airline run profitably. The reforms bore fruit by 2003, with the airline posting a profit of US$15.8 million for that year.

A Boeing 767 was acquired in August 2002, replacing the Airbus aircraft, and was used to offer expanded international services. Combined with aggressive pricing, this made it the most competitively priced airline on many of its routes. A sharing agreement still exists with Qantas in which that airline buys "blocks" of seats on Air Niugini's flights between Port Moresby and Australia.

The financial turnaround seems to have stymied pressure from various sectors, including the IMF and the Australian Government, to privatise the national carrier. The PNG government has voiced concerns that privatisation would jeopardise domestic routes that provide a vital service to regional people and encourage economic development, but which fail to realise a profit.

From September 2004, Fokker 100s have been introduced to start to replace the aging Fokker F28 aircraft that are used on domestic routes, the daily Cairns service, and the twice a week service to Honiara in the Solomon Islands.

In March 2006, Transport and Civil Aviation Minister Don Polye announced an open air policy, which would allow other airlines to fly international routes into and from Papua New Guinea. The policy will take effect in 2007.

In December 2007, Air Niugini returned its leased Boeing 767 aircraft to its owners, Air New Zealand. The airline briefly entered a wet lease arrangement with Viva Macau before taking up a lease with Icelandair for a Boeing 767-300ER and a Boeing 757-200W. The 757 was returned in March 2011 and replaced with two additional 767-300ER aircraft.

On 18 April 2008, flights commenced on the Sydney-Port Moresby route initially using leased Embraer 190 aircraft leased from SkyAirWorld of Australia.

On 15 October 2014, Air Niugini announced a wholly owned subsidiary airline company, Link PNG, which commenced operations on 1 November 2014 to coincide with Air Niugini's 41 years of operation. Link PNG principally services routes to provincial and district centres which were being operated by the Air Niugini Dash-8-Q200 and Q300 aircraft. 7 Fokker-70 aircraft were acquired (October 2015) from KLM and were transferred during Oct-Dec 2015.

In June 2018, people rioting in the town of Mendi following disputed election results destroyed a Link PNG Dash-8 at the town's airport.

On 14 June 2019, Air Niugini announced it would take over the Cairns-Hong Kong route that Cathay Pacific was abandoning.  They would fly via Port Moresby hoping to have considerable income derived from transporting live seafood to Asian markets.

In July 2019, Air Niugini cancelled its order for a single 787-8 which was postponed infinitely beforehand.

Destinations 

Air Niugini operates to 25 domestic destinations and 14 international destinations in 10 countries across Asia and Oceania as of March 2017.

Codeshare agreements 
Air Niugini has codeshare agreements with the following airlines:

 Cathay Pacific
 Qantas
 Solomon Airlines

Fleet

Current Air Niugini fleet 

, the Air Niugini fleet consists of the following aircraft:

Current Link PNG fleet 
The Link PNG fleet consists of the following aircraft (as of August 2016):

Former fleet 
 Airbus A300
 Airbus A310
 ATR 42-300
 Avro RJ70
 Boeing 707
 Boeing 720
 Boeing 737-200
 Boeing 737-700
 Boeing 757-200
 Dash 7
 Bombardier Dash8 Q100
 Bombardier Dash8 Q200
 Dassault Falcon 900
 Douglas DC-3
 Fokker F27
 Fokker F28

Incidents

Air Niugini Flight PX73 

In the morning of 28 September 2018, Flight PX73 (Operated by Boeing 737-800 P2-PXE) landed  short of the runway into a lagoon off Chuuk International Airport in Weno, Chuuk of the Federated States of Micronesia. There were forty seven people on board the aircraft (thirty six passengers and eleven crew). According to initial reports, all forty seven survived, and there were no serious injuries. However, shortly after the crash, the airline reported one missing passenger. On Monday, 1 October, two days after the crash, Air Niugini announced the death of a single male passenger.

See also 
 List of airlines of Papua New Guinea

References

External links 
 
 Official website

Airlines of Papua New Guinea
Airlines established in 1973
Government-owned airlines
1973 establishments in Papua New Guinea